The , also known as the Miracle Planet Museum of Plants, is a botanical garden within a greenhouse located at Yumebutai 4 Banchi, Higashiura-cho, Tsuna, Awaji, Hyōgo, Japan. It is open most days; an admission fee is charged.

The greenhouse opened in 2000, and contains a fern room, an atrium with small gardens, and five additional rooms as follows:

 Plants Gallery - succulent plants with art objects
 Tropical Garden
 New Lifestyle with Plants - various styles of Japanese gardens
 Healing Garden - nature and art
 Flower Show Space - space for floral exhibits (1,000 m²)

See also 

 Awaji Yumebutai
 List of botanical gardens in Japan

References 

 Kiseki No Hoshi Greenhouse (Japanese)
 Jardins Botaniques Japonais (French)

Botanical gardens in Japan
Gardens in Hyōgo Prefecture
Greenhouses in Japan